Angel Georgiev Stoykov (born 24 August 1977) is a former Bulgarian footballer who played as a midfielder.

He played for Chernomorets Burgas, Spartak Varna, CSKA Sofia, Marek Dupnitsa, Slavia Sofia, Cypriot Nea Salamis Famagusta FC and Kaliakra Kavarna.

References

1977 births
Living people
Bulgarian footballers
Bulgarian expatriate footballers
Expatriate footballers in Cyprus
FC Chernomorets Burgas players
PFC Spartak Varna players
PFC CSKA Sofia players
PFC Marek Dupnitsa players
PFC Slavia Sofia players
Nea Salamis Famagusta FC players
PFC Kaliakra Kavarna players
PFC Nesebar players
First Professional Football League (Bulgaria) players
Second Professional Football League (Bulgaria) players
Cypriot First Division players
Association football midfielders